Oenonella is an extinct genus from a well-known class of fossil marine arthropods, the trilobites. It lived during the later part of the Arenig stage of the Ordovician Period, approximately 478 to 471 million years ago.

References

Proetida
Ordovician trilobites
Ordovician trilobites of Europe
Fossils of Norway